Berghia creutzbergi is a species of sea slug, an aeolid nudibranch. It is a shell-less marine gastropod mollusc in the family Aeolidiidae.

Distribution
This species is an inhabitant of the Tropical Western Atlantic Ocean present in Brazil, Curaçao, Venezuela, Barbados, Bahamas, the Cayman Islands, the Caribbean coast of Costa Rica, Cuba and Florida.

Description
Berghia creutzbergi has a maximum reported size of 30 mm.

Habitat 
This species is found in depths from 0 to 5 m.

References

Aeolidiidae
Gastropods described in 1970